Animal Well is an upcoming Metroidvania game developed by Shared Memory and published by Bigmode. The player controls a blob and explores a labyrinth while avoiding animals. It will be released for PlayStation 5 and Windows.

Gameplay 
Animal Well revolves around exploration and puzzle solving. It has platforming elements to traverse the well. The developer has described the game as not having that large of a map, "but it aims to be much denser".

Development 
Animal Well started development in 2017. It uses a custom engine designed by the game's sole developer, Billy Basso. The game is rendered in different layers, using various lighting techniques, fluid simulation and particle effects to give the 2D art a sense of depth. The engine also allows for very low latency, allowing for precise platforming. In January 2023, YouTuber videogamedunkey announced that Animal Well would be the first game released by his indie game publisher Bigmode.

References 

PlayStation 5 games
Metroidvania games
Upcoming video games
Video games about animals